The O.C. Sarles House at 2nd Ave. and 3rd St., NE, in Hillsboro, North Dakota was built in 1881.  It was listed on the National Register of Historic Places (NRHP), but it was removed from the NRHP in 2009.

Its NRHP nomination in 1984 identified it as "Hillsboro's earliest and finest example of Victorian architecture."

Delistings of NRHP-listed properties usually follow demolition or other severe loss of historic integrity of a building.

References

Houses on the National Register of Historic Places in North Dakota
Victorian architecture in North Dakota
Houses completed in 1881
Houses in Traill County, North Dakota
Former National Register of Historic Places in North Dakota
National Register of Historic Places in Traill County, North Dakota
1881 establishments in Dakota Territory